The City of Rockdale was a local government area in southern and St George regions of Sydney, in the state of New South Wales, Australia. First proclaimed on 13  January 1871, Rockdale was formerly known as the Municipality of West Botany until 1887 and the Municipality of Rockdale before being proclaimed as a City in 1995. Rockdale was amalgamated with the neighbouring City of Botany Bay on 9 September 2016 to form the new municipality of Bayside Council.

The last Mayor of the City of Rockdale at amalgamation was Cr. Bill Saravinovski, a member of the Labor Party.

Suburbs and localities in the local government area 
Suburbs in the City of Rockdale were:

The City of Rockdale also managed and maintained the following localities:

History

West Botany
The City of Rockdale was originally proclaimed as the "Municipal District of West Botany" on 13 January 1871 and covered  with two Wards, West Botany Ward and Arncliffe Ward. The proclamation followed a petition signed by 85 residents calling for incorporation that was published in the Government Gazette on 22 August 1870. The first election was held on 8 February 1871 at the Tempe Family Hotel on Rocky Point Road. The Mayor of Marrickville, Charles St Julian, was appointed Returning Officer for the first election of six aldermen and two auditors, which was declared on 14 February 1871: 
  

On 28 February 1871, Frederick Keene was appointed the first Clerk. Thomas Willmot was appointed Clerk on 13 August 1872. Thomas Leeder was appointed Clerk on 7 August 1877. Percival Somerville was appointed Clerk on 23 March 1905. On 17 December 1886, West Botany Ward was split in two, adding Rockdale Ward and Scarborough Ward and bringing the number of Aldermen from six to nine. Among the main developers during this period was Frederick Jamison Gibbes, a member of parliament whose name is perpetuated by Gibbes Street in Banksia. From 1872, Council met in the first Council Chambers, a small purpose-built stone building on the western side of Rocky Point Road, Arncliffe built by Christopher Bush of St Peters. It continued in use until 11 December 1888, when a new Town Hall was opened by the Mayor, William George Judd, on the corner of Rocky Point Road and Bryant Street, Rockdale. The old Council Chambers building was eventually sold in 1904.

Rockdale Municipality
The name "Rockdale" for the West Botany area was first suggested in 1878, and that name gained more credence when the local railway station on the new Illawarra rail line, opened on 15 October 1884, was also given the name Rockdale. However, by the time the neighbouring Boroughs of Botany and North Botany (Mascot from 1911) were proclaimed on 29 March 1888, it was clear that a name change was desirable. On 17 May 1888 the Parliament of New South Wales passed the Rockdale Municipality Naming Act (No.33, 1888), and West Botany became the "Municipal District of Rockdale". On 31 December 1900, a fourth ward was added, Hopetoun Ward, named after the soon-to-be first Governor-General of Australia, bringing the number of aldermen to twelve. The 1887 Town Hall was replaced by the current Rockdale Town Hall in 1940, and was designed by Rockdale architect Douglas Gardiner.

The area of the municipality was reduced when the mouth of Cooks River was moved further south of its original position in the mid-1940s, to allow for the extension of Sydney Airport at Mascot. Under the Local Government (Areas) Act 1948, the Municipality of Bexley, which was located immediately to the West and had separated from Hurstville in 1900, became the First Ward of Rockdale Municipality. Rockdale was declared a city in 1995 as the "City of Rockdale".

2002 corruption inquiry

During 2002, two elected officials of Rockdale City Council were at the centre of an Independent Commission Against Corruption (ICAC) inquiry. The inquiry revealed that the Deputy Mayor, Adam McCormick (Labor) and Councillor Andrew Smyrnis (Liberal) engaged in corrupt conduct with two property developers Con Chartofillis and Terry Andriotakis via two intermediaries, Manuel Limberis and Tony Retsos. Both councillors resigned from Council and a by-election was held on 31 August 2002 to replace the two disgraced councillors.

Following consideration of the briefs and evidence involved, the DPP commenced action. It was successful in recording convictions, and the known determinations made by the Courts are as follows:
Smyrnis was sentenced to two years periodic detention.
Retsos was fined $80,000 and sentenced to three years periodic detention.
McCormick, protested his innocence; with Smyrnis agreeing to testify against him. McCormick was sentenced to a maximum of five years in custody for receiving $70,000 in bribes in return for delivering Labor Party support for a development application and for lying to the inquiry.

Amalgamation
In response to the merger proposal, Rockdale Council indicated their preference to merge with the City of Kogarah and the City of Hurstville, forming a single "St George Council". 

With the proclamation of the majority of council amalgamations on 12 May 2016, Botany Bay Council appealed the decision in the Supreme Court of New South Wales, thereby delaying the proposed amalgamation until a decision was made by the Court. The Supreme Court rejected the appeal in early September 2016, and the Minister for Local Government, Paul Toole, moved quickly to proclaim the formation of Bayside Council on 9 September 2016, with the General Manager of Rockdale since 2011, Meredith Wallace, appointed as the new General Manager of Bayside Council. On 9 September 2017, the first Council consisting of fifteen Councillors across 5 wards was elected, and the former Mayor of Rockdale, Bill Saravinovski, was elected as the first Mayor on 27 September.

Demographics 
At the 2011 Census, there were  people in the Rockdale local government area, of these 49.4% were male and 50.6% were female. Aboriginal and Torres Strait Islander people made up 0.6% of the population. The median age of people in the City of Rockdale was 36 years. Children aged 0 – 14 years made up 17.4% of the population and people aged 65 years and over made up 15.1% of the population. Of people in the area aged 15 years and over, 50.9% were married and 10.8% were either divorced or separated.

Population growth in the City of Rockdale between the 2001 Census and the 2006 Census was 5.09%; and in the subsequent five years to the 2011 Census, population growth was 5.66%. When compared with total population growth of Australia for the same periods, being 5.78% and 8.32% respectively, population growth in the Rockdale local government area was on par with the national average. The median weekly income for residents within the City of Rockdale was on par with the national average.

The proportion of residents who stated their ancestry was Macedonian was 6.5 times the New South Wales and national averages; the proportion of households where Macedonian is spoken at home is in excess of eight times the state and national averages; and the proportion of residents who stated an affiliation with Eastern Orthodox religion was in excess of six times the state and national averages.

Council

Final composition and election method
Rockdale City Council was composed of fifteen Councillors elected proportionally as five separate wards, each electing three Councillors. All Councillors were elected for a fixed four-year term of office. The Mayor was elected by the Councillors at the first meeting of the Council. The last election was held on 8 September 2012, and the final makeup of the Council was as follows:

Mayors

Library
Rockdale first tried to establish a library service in the late 1880s, with the council appointing the first Librarian, William Henry Hardwick, on 31 October 1890. The Rockdale Free Library was officially opened in the Town Hall by Sir Henry Parkes on 10 April 1893 with a modest collection of 200 books. This library, however did not see much use and by 1900 the library's books were described that they would go mouldy but for the moving they get when the attendant dusts them." Rockdale Council therefore resolved to divest Council of the library and move the collection to the Rockdale School of Arts.

Despite several attempts to recreate this library service, Rockdale Council did not devote any time to the project until 1954 when it decided to start a 'Mobile Library' service as a first act to gauge the level of public interest.

Beginning in November 1955, the Rockdale mobile library, with five stops and 9,500 books, was funded through a special library levy on ratepayers of 25 pence in the pound. With more than 2500 borrowers registered in the first five weeks, the demand required Council to increase the number of stops from five to eleven and employ two extra library staff. This demand continued to grow and Rockdale moved to re-establish a permanent library, opening the first Rockdale library in February 1958 with a stock of 8,002 books. Located behind the Town Hall, in September 1983 the library building was demolished to make way for the Rockdale Council Administration Centre and the Town Hall was refurbished for the Rockdale Central Library opened in September 1984.

The Rockdale Central Library remained in the Town Hall in a northern wing dedicated for the purposed until this section was demolished to make way for a new Library, designed by Brewster Hjorth Architects. The new Rockdale Library fronting the Princes Highway was officially opened on 30 July 2016 as the central library for the new Bayside Council.

Coat of arms

Sister cities
  Takéo, Cambodia
  Tianjin, Tanggu, China
  Bitola, North Macedonia
  Glyfada, Greece
  Rockdale, Texas, US
  Bint Jbeil, Lebanon
  Yamatsuri, Fukushima, Japan
  Gilgandra, New South Wales, Australia

References

External links 
Rockdale City Council website (Archived)

Rockdale
Rockdale
Rockdale
Bayside Council
Botany Bay
 
Rockdale